Tmesiphorus costalis is a species of ant-loving beetle in the family Staphylinidae. It is found in North America.

References

Further reading

 

Pselaphitae
Articles created by Qbugbot
Beetles described in 1849